John McAll  is a pianist, composer, arranger and producer with experience ranging from jazz, pop, blues, rock contemporary classical, afrobeat and theatre.

John McAll graduated with a Bachelor of Arts University of Melbourne Faculty of VCA and MCM in 1983 and has worked predominantly as a live musician ever since.

John McAll launched his debut recording as band leader and composer in June 2009 with Black Money on independent label Audacity Media. The band performed at the Wangaratta Festival of Jazz in October that year, and the album was rated in the top Albums of the year by Herald-Sun Jazz reviewer Roger Mitchell in December.

As a founding member of the acclaimed David Chesworth Ensemble, John McAll has performed internationally in New York City, Slovenia, extensively through the UK, South Africa and Paris, France. He regularly tours Australia and Europe with The Black Sorrows, appears at a diverse range of music festivals with the Public Opinion Afro Orchestra, performs and writes for Eugene Hamilton and the Money, and performs live jazz regularly in Melbourne with Brian Abrahams' District 6, the B# Big Band, Nichaud Fitzgibbon, Alyce Platt, Rebecca Barnard and Jane Clifton.

He has worked with Gregory Porter, Wycliffe Gordon, Ross Wilson, David Campbell, Debra Byrne, Renee Geyer, Nina Ferro, Ruby Carter and Vince Jones,as well as playing international concert stages with The David Chesworth Ensemble, Vika Bull and The Black Sorrows. For a time he was part of 1980s pop group I'm Talking.
In August 2012 John McAll joined forces with Joe Camilleri to create a big band called The Voodoo Sheiks.
He subsequently became Keyboardist for Camilleris band The Black Sorrows

Selected discography
St Georges Rd  The Black Sorrows- Piano, Organ. 2021
Digital Afrika Asiko Keyboards Synth
Zedsix The shape of Jazz - piano
Standing Strong  – Ray Dimakarri Dixon – NIMA Nomination
Secular- John McAll Composer 2018
Naming and Blaming – The Public Opinion Afro Orchestra 2018
Digital Afrika – keyboards, Synth 2018 
Citizen John – The Black sorrows – co-producer 2018 
United in Swing – The B Sharp Big band – Produced by Wycliffe Gordon
Faithful Satellite – The Black Sorrows- Co Producer 2016
Endless Sleep – The Black Sorrows- Co Producer 2015 – ARIA Nomination
Certified Blue – The Black Sorrows-Co Producer 2013 –  ARIA Nomination
Alter Ego – John McAll composer 2012
Crooked Little Thoughts – Joe Camilleri 2012
Tekopia – the David Chesworth Ensemble 2012
Do Anything Go Anywhere – The Public Opinion Afro Orchestra 2010 – ARIA Nomination
Black Money – John McAll composer 2009
5 Decades of Cool (DVD) – Ross Wilson 2008
Tributary - Ross Wilson 2007
Bakelite Radio Volume IV – Joe Camilleri 2007
Roarin' Town – Black Sorrows 2006
Music To See Through David Chesworth Ensemble – Winner APRA Classical Award 2006
Go Bongo, Go Wild – Ross Wilson 2003
Badlands – David Chesworth Ensemble2001
Exotica suite – David Chesworth Ensemble 1997- ARIA Nomination
One Day Spent – Vince Jones 1990
Lovetown – Stephen Cummings 1988

Touring and performance highlights 
2023 Banyule Twilight sounds Festival MC
2023 Shanghai Mimi Lunar New Year Concert Box Hill
2022 Shanghai Mimi Auckland Cabaret Festival
2022 Shanghai Mimi Adelaide Cabaret Festival
2022 Banyule Twilight sounds Festival, Artistic Director/MC
2019 St Kilda Jazz Summit co Artistic Director Music supervisor.
2019 Shanghai Mimi Terracotta Warriors/ Cai Guo- Qiang exhibition
2019 Shanghai Mimi Sydney Festival Composer, Musical Director
2018 UK Major Theatres Tour, At Last the Etta James Story featuring Vika Bull
2018 Black Money Secular Launch Birds Basement Melbourne
2017 UK/ European tour Black Sorrows 
2017 UK tour At Last the Etta James story, featuring Vika Bull- Musical Director/Arranger
2015 UK/ European tour Black Sorrows
2015 Lets Get It on the Life and music of Marvin Gaye with Lloyd Cele Johannesburg Theatre May 
2014 Here Comes the Night With the Melbourne Symphony Orchestra Conductor Composer/Arranger
2014 Here Comes the Night With the Sydney Symphony Orchestra Conductor Composer/Arranger
2014 Trondheim Blues Festival Norway with The Black Sorrows
2014 Byron Bay Blues Festival Black Sorrows
2014 Byron Bay Blues Festival with Garland Jeffries
2014 Lets Get It On, The life and Music of Marvin Gaye Musical Director/Arranger
2014 The Songs of James Bond Athanaeum Music Supervisor/Arranger
2013 Here Comes The Night, Van Morrison Homage featuring Joe Camilleri, Vince Jones, Vika Bull, The Silo String Quartet Musical Director/Arranger
2013 At Last the Etta James story featuring Vika Bull Musical Director/Arranger
2012 Gregory Porter headline Wangaratta Jazz festival John McALL Quartet
2012 Gregory Porter November Australian tour with the John McALL Quartet
2012 Black Money Alter ego CD launch at Bennetts Lane with Julien Wilson and Nui Moon
2012 Black Money performs Alter Ego at the Stonnington Jazz Festival
2011 Byron Bay Blues and Roots Festival with the Public Opinion Afro Orchestra
2010 Falls Festival with The Public Opinion Afro Orchestra
2009 Performances at Melbourne Recital Centre
2009 Black Money at Wangaratta Jazz Festival
2009 Black Money CD launch Bennetts Lane
2009 Five Decades of Cool, Ross Wilson, Byron Bay Blues and Roots festival
2009 Five Decades of Cool, Ross Wilson, Palais Theater Melbourne Musical Director
2008 Performances in Sydney, Brisbane & on ABC TV Sunday Arts DCE
2007 The Big Chill Festival, Ledbury Castle, England DCE
2007 Paris Quartier d'Ete Festival France DCE
2006 Performance at Classical Music Awards Sydney (AWARD WINNER "Instrumental Work of the Year" for Panopticon DCE)
2005 Music to See Through CD launch performances in Melbourne and Sydney DCE
2003 Performances in Ljubljana, Slovenia. Performance at the AFI Awards broadcast nationally on ABC TV DCE
2002 Performance with Nick Cave and the Bad Seeds at the Forum, Melbourne DCE
2001 BAM Next Wave Festival DCE
2001 Bang on a Can Marathon, New York and Kennedy Centre, Washington DCE.
2001 Australian East Coast tour including "10 Days on the Island" Festival DCE
2000 ABC TV Arts Show Special "Live at the Night Cat" DCE
1999 Live-to air-concert, New Music Show, ABC Classic FM DCE
1997 Melbourne International Festival of the Arts
1996 Port Fairy Spring Music Festival
1995 Melbourne International Festival of the Arts
1995 Winterarts, Victorian Arts Centre
1994 Sydney Spring Festival of Music DCE
1994 The Two Executioners- Chamber made opera- AGE PERFORMING ARTS AWARD
1992 The Cars that ate Paris -Chamber made Opera
1992 Lacuna, music: David Chesworth- Chamber made opera
1992 Wendy Harmer Love gone Wrong Australian tour
1989 Adelaide Festival Vince Jones
1986 Australian National tour with "Im Talking"
1983 performance of Brian Browns Wildflowers with the VCA Symphony Orchestra

References

External links
https://www.smh.com.au/entertainment/music/booming-voice-touches-on-faith-20121106-28w03.html
http://www.theaustralian.com.au/arts/review/alter-ego-john-mcall/story-fn9n8gph-1226430089307
 List of people from Melbourne
http://www.discogs.com/Ross-Wilson-Tributary/release/1918912
https://web.archive.org/web/20110311171116/http://www.allaboutjazz.com/php/musician.php?id=19965
http://www.trombone.com.au/trombone-articles/2009/6/13/jazz/
http://www.heraldsun.com.au/entertainment/arts-books/jazz-brothers-hook-up-for-sibling-revelry-at-stonnington-jazz/story-fn7euh6j-1226364466105
http://www.abc.net.au/local/audio/2013/01/31/3680445.htm

Australian jazz pianists
Musicians from Melbourne
Living people
1960 births
21st-century pianists
University of Melbourne alumni